Miwaladeniya is a village in Sri Lanka. It is located within Central Province.It is situated in the Udunuwara constituency it has a population of Sinhalese and Muslim

See also
List of towns in Central Province, Sri Lanka

External links

Populated places in Kandy District